Blockfest is an annual hip-hop festival held in Tampere, Finland. Normally held in August, the concert features the most popular acts that hip-hop and R&B have to offer in a particular year. In recent years, the event has been organized in the city center of Tampere, near Ratina Stadium, right next to the Laukontori square and the Koskikeskus shopping center. Blockfest is one of the biggest hip-hop festivals in the Nordic countries and is sold out every year already in advance.

Over the course of its history, Blockfest has featured the most popular Finnish hip-hop artists, such as JVG, Fintelligens, Cheek, Asa, Lord Est and Redrama. In addition, top international artists are included in the line-up every year, and the festival has previously starred Wu-Tang Clan, Snoop Dogg, Ice Cube, Nas, ASAP Rocky, Wiz Khalifa, Post Malone, G-Eazy and 50 Cent.

Since celebrating its 10th anniversary in 2017, Blockfest has become Finland's first cashless festival, where nothing is paid for with cash. Payments are made with a payment wristband, which also serves as an entry wristband.

Blockfest announced in December 2019 an 18-year age limit for the 2020 Blockfest, which is still in place. The change to an age-restricted event caused outrage among young people.

As a result of the COVID-19 pandemic, the event was not organized in 2020. The 2021 event was also canceled for the same reason.

See also
List of hip hop music festivals 
Hip hop culture

References

External links
 Blockfest – Official Site (in English)
 Blockfest 2022 at Live Nation

Hip hop music festivals
Music festivals established in 2002
Music festivals in Finland
Events in Tampere